Wing Commander Forest Frederick Edward Yeo-Thomas,  (17 June 1902 – 26 February 1964), known as "Tommy", was a British Special Operations Executive (SOE) agent in the Second World War. Codenamed "Seahorse" and "Shelley" in the SOE, Yeo-Thomas was known by the Gestapo as "The White Rabbit". His particular sphere of operations was Occupied and Vichy France. He was one of the most highly decorated agents in the Second World War.

Early life
Forest Frederick Edward Yeo-Thomas was born in London to John Yeo Thomas, a coal merchant, and Daisy Ethel Thomas (born Burrows). Early in his life, his family moved to Dieppe, France. He spoke both English and French fluently. Lying about his age, he enlisted in the US Army at the age of 16 and served on the Western Front as a dispatch rider in 1918. He saw action in the Polish-Soviet War of 1919 and 1920, fighting alongside the Poles. He was captured by the Soviet Russian forces and avoided execution by escaping, in the process strangling a Soviet guard.

Between the wars, Yeo-Thomas held a number of jobs. He trained as an apprentice engineer with Rolls-Royce then became an accountant for a firm of travel agents before joining Molyneux in 1932, a successful fashion-house in Paris, rising to become a director.

Early RAF service

On the outbreak of war in 1939, Yeo-Thomas was still living in France. He attempted to join the British Army but was turned down as they had received enough recruits at that stage of the war. He then attempted to join the French Foreign Legion but they were not accepting Britons. After placing his car at the service of the British Air Attaché in France he was granted permission to join the RAF in September 1939.

He applied to be trained as an air gunner but this application was rejected due to his age, instead he was enlisted as an AC2 (the lowest rank possible) in the Intelligence Branch taking up the trade of interpreter. His first posting was to a forward air ammunition park with the Advanced Air Striking Force (AASF) in France. He was soon promoted to corporal and then acting sergeant before being posted back to HQ Fighter Command and a Bomber Liaison Section at RAF Stanmore Park in England. While stationed here he met his second 'wife' Barbara who was then a young WAAF. At this point, a second application to become an air gunner was refused.

Posted back to France in April 1940, Yeo-Thomas was based at Le Bourget Aerodrome when he was caught up in the rapid German advance. In June 1940 he withdrew with his unit, travelling 800 km across France via Tours, Limoges and Bordeaux - finally sailing to England from Pointe de Grave. Before embarking on a ship to England he purchased a postcard from a stall at the monument commemorating the landing of American troops in France 1917, he sent it to a friend with the prophetic words "I know how you are feeling at present, but don't get discouraged. We will return and liberate France."

Back in England, he was assigned to work as an interpreter with the Free French Forces before being recommended for a commission by his commanding officer. He was commissioned as a pilot officer in the Administrative and Special Duties Branch of the RAFVR on 28 November 1940 and posted to No. 308 Polish Fighter Squadron as an intelligence officer, receiving further promotion to flying officer on 28 November 1941. After repeated complaints about his misemployment, and threatening to raise the issue in Parliament, he was posted to RF Section of the Special Operations Executive in February 1942.

Life as an agent

At first, Yeo-Thomas worked in an administrative capacity, but SOE soon used him as a liaison officer with the Bureau Central de Renseignements et d'Action (BCRA), the Free French intelligence agency. He was parachuted into occupied France for the first time on 25 February 1943. Both within France and back in England, Yeo-Thomas forged links with Major Pierre Brossolette and Andre Dewavrin (who went under the codename "Colonel Passy"), and between them they created a strategy for obstructing the German occupation of France. During his missions in France, he dined with prolific and infamous Nazis, such as Klaus Barbie who was known as the "Butcher of Lyon", to gather vital information, returning again to France on 17 September 1943. He was appalled by the lack of logistical and material support which the French resistance movements such as the maquis were receiving, to the extent that he begged five minutes with Winston Churchill, the British Prime Minister. Churchill, reluctant at first, but fascinated by what Yeo-Thomas told him, agreed to help him obtain resources for the resistance.

In February 1944, Yeo-Thomas was parachuted into France after flying from RAF Tempsford. However, he was betrayed and captured at the Passy metro station in Paris. In endeavouring to hide his true identity, Yeo-Thomas claimed he was a British pilot named Kenneth Dodkin. He was then taken by the Gestapo to their headquarters at Avenue Foch and subjected to brutal torture by Ernst Misselwitz, including repeated submersion in ice-cold water (each time to the point that artificial respiration was required to bring him back to consciousness), innumerable physical beatings, and electric shocks applied to the genitals.  Held in Fresnes prison, he made two failed attempts to escape and was transferred first to Compiègne prison and then to Buchenwald concentration camp. At Buchenwald with the help of Arthur Dietzsch he was committed to block 46, the Epidemic Typhus Experimentation Station (Fleckfieberversuchsstation) as a typhus patient. Together with Stéphane Hessel and Harry Peulevé, he was also given the name of a Frenchman (Maurice Choquet) who had died a short time earlier, and whose death had not yet been reported. Under this new identity he survived as "a hospital orderly", being later transferred to "Willie", one of the many sub-camps of Buchenwald, at Tröglitz/Rehmsdorf in Saxony-Anhalt. The inmates were deployed there (from June 1944 onwards) primarily in the reconstruction of a coal liquefaction plant destroyed by allied bombing, which belonged to the Brabag company. Within the camp, he began to organize resistance and again made a brief escape. On his recapture, he passed himself off as a French national and was sent to a prisoner-of-war camp, Stalag XX-B, near Marienburg.

While at Buchenwald, Yeo-Thomas met Squadron Leader Phil Lamason, the officer in charge of 168 Allied airmen being held there. At great risk, Yeo-Thomas assisted Lamason in getting the word out of the camp to the German Luftwaffe of the airmen's captivity, knowing that RAF prisoners of war were the responsibility of the Luftwaffe, not of the Gestapo. He had to don many disguises, as well as shooting an enemy agent point blank with a pistol to escape. Eventually he succeeded and reached Allied lines in late April 1945.

After the war

After the war, Yeo-Thomas was to be an important witness at the Nuremberg trials in the identification of Buchenwald officials.  He was a key prosecution witness at the Buchenwald trial held at Dachau Concentration Camp between April and August 1947. At this trial, 31 members of the Buchenwald staff were convicted of war crimes. He was also a surprise defence witness in the war crimes trial of Otto Skorzeny, particularly on the charge of Skorzeny's use of American uniforms in infiltrating American lines. Yeo-Thomas testified that he and his operatives wore German uniforms behind enemy lines while working for the SOE.

He died at the age of 61 in his Paris apartment following a massive haemorrhage. He was cremated in Paris and then subsequently repatriated to be interred in Brookwood Cemetery, Surrey, where his grave can be found in the Pine Glade Garden of Remembrance. In March 2010 his life was commemorated with an English Heritage blue plaque erected at his flat in Queen Court where he lived in Guilford Street, Bloomsbury.

He was played by Kenneth More in the 1967 TV series The White Rabbit.

Awards and honours
Yeo-Thomas's medal list:

Yeo-Thomas's George Cross and other medals are displayed within the Lord Ashcroft Gallery at the Imperial War Museum.

The Mairie of the 16th Arrondissement in Paris (where the Passy Metro Station is located) has a bust of Yeo-Thomas.

George Cross citation

The London Gazette 15 February 1946 citation read:

In popular culture
 Ian Fleming wrote in his memoirs of his fascination with the military career by Forest Thomas, becoming one of the inspirations behind the fictional character James Bond
 Michael Caine in the 1958 film Carve Her Name with Pride (minor uncredited appearance)
 Kenneth More in the BBC 1967 television mini-series The White Rabbit (1967)
 Peter Hudson in the 2008 French television mini-series La Résistance

References

Bibliography 
 Bruce Marshall, The White Rabbit (1952)
 Mark Seaman, Bravest of the Brave: True Story of Wing Commander Tommy Yeo-Thomas – SOE Secret Agent Codename, the White Rabbit (1997)
 Brigitte Friang, Parachutes and Petticoats (1958)
 Leo Marks, Between Silk and Cyanide: A Codemaker's Story 1941-1945 (1998)
 Sophie Jackson, Churchill's White Rabbit (2012)

External links
Biography of Forest Yeo-Thomas at Nigel Perrin's site

1902 births
1964 deaths
British recipients of the George Cross
Royal Air Force recipients of the George Cross
Recipients of the Croix de Guerre 1939–1945 (France)
British Special Operations Executive personnel
Royal Air Force wing commanders
Burials at Brookwood Cemetery
Commandeurs of the Légion d'honneur
Buchenwald concentration camp survivors
Recipients of the Military Cross
British World War II prisoners of war
World War II prisoners of war held by Germany
Royal Air Force personnel of World War II
United States Army personnel of World War I
United States Army soldiers
People of the Polish–Soviet War
Child soldiers in World War I
Prisoners of war held by the Soviet Union
British escapees
Escapees from Soviet detention
Royal Air Force Volunteer Reserve personnel of World War II